Mary Anne Balsillie is a former politician from Alberta, Canada.

In 1977, she was elected to the Municipal Council for the Town of Morinville. She served as a town councillor until 1992, when she ran for mayor and defeated long-time incumbent Ross Quinn. She served as Mayor until 1996.

Balisillie worked for the Alberta Home and School Association, and became part of a committee to help create Bill 41, the School Amendment Act; it was introduced in the Alberta legislature in 1992. The bill was designed to help increase rights for francophone parents and students. The bill died in committee.

Following Redwater MLA Nicholas Taylor's appointment to the Senate in 1996, Balsillie ran in the ensuing by-election for the Alberta Liberals. She again defeated Ross Quinn, who represented the Progressive Conservatives, by 98 votes.  As a member of the Official Opposition she served on the Law and Regulations Committee.

In the 1997 Alberta general election she was defeated by Progressive Conservative Dave Broda by 316 votes. In 2001, Balsille was elected as a representative to the Aspen Regional Health Authority.  She is currently the executive director for the St. Albert Stop Abuse in Families (SAIF) Society in St. Albert

External links
Mary Anne Balsillie guest introduction, the Alberta Legislative Assembly June 19, 1992
May 21, 1996 by-election
Mary Anne Balsillie being introduced by Grant Mitchell in the Legislative Assembly May 22, 1996
Power of Caring Volume 1 Issue 1

People from Sturgeon County
Year of birth missing (living people)
Living people
Alberta Liberal Party MLAs
Women MLAs in Alberta
Place of birth missing (living people)